Coleophora exlentii is a moth of the family Coleophoridae. It is found in the lower Volga area in southern Russia.

The larvae feed on Climacoptera brachiata.

References

exlentii
Moths described in 2005
Moths of Europe